The New Mexico Department of Workforce Solutions is a state government agency in New Mexico. The agency is responsible for economic development, education initiatives, labor relations, unemployment, workforce technology, volunteerism, and workforce development.

Structure 
The agency is managed by a cabinet secretary appointed by the Governor of New Mexico. The most recent Secretary of the Department of Workforce Solutions was Bill McCamley, a former member of the New Mexico House of Representatives, served as Secretary from January, 2019 to April, 2021.

References 

State agencies of New Mexico

State departments of labor of the United States